The Cabinet of Denmark has been the chief executive body and the government of the Kingdom of Denmark since 1848. The Cabinet is led by the Prime Minister. There are around 25 members of the Cabinet, known as "ministers", all of whom are also heads of specific government ministries. The Cabinet has usually been composed of Ministers from two or more parties forming a coalition government. Still, most of these governments have been minority governments, relying on the support of still other parties.

Cabinets are formally appointed by the Monarch. In practice, once a government has stepped down, there is a fixed set of rules for appointing an investigator (most often the future Prime Minister), with the job of trying to form a new government. The Prime Minister will lead the Cabinet by convention. Cabinets are named after the Prime Minister, although they may gain shorthand names (e.g. "VK Cabinet", for the recent Venstre–Conservative cabinet).

As of 15 December 2022, the Prime Minister is Mette Frederiksen, leading a coalition government led by the Social Democratic Party with Venstre and the Moderates. It relies on parliamentary support from the Faroe Islands-based and Greelandic parties.

List of Cabinets
Below is a list of all Cabinets since 1848.

See also

 List of Danish government ministries
 Council of State,  the privy council of Denmark
 Politics of Denmark, for a more detailed description of the political system of Denmark.

References

List of Danish governments - From the official website of Folketinget
Homepage of the Prime minister

 
Denmark